Nicholas Queytrot (c. 1475 – c. 1550), also called Nicholas Greytrot or  Nicholas Coitrotte, was a wealthy merchant and citizen of Dublin city in the sixteenth century, who served one term as Mayor of Dublin.

He is first heard of in the spring of 1504, when the Dublin city fathers employed him to build a flight of stairs leading up to the City Assembly Rooms. His business affairs prospered: in the 1520s he held 30 acres of land at Ballimo, County Dublin, jointly with William More. In 1537 he took a lease for 41 years of a property at Dame's-gate, off present-day Dame Street in Dublin city centre. In 1543 he was leasing three shops in St. Audoen's parish, for which he managed, through a legal technicality, to pay no rent (an indication of his shrewd business sense). He was Mayor of Dublin in 1523–1524, and the city auditor from 1530 to 1537.

He was an Alderman of the city of Dublin in 1527. In that year he sat on a panel of four arbitrators appointed to determine a number of disputes between the Dublin City authorities and the Abbey of St. Thomas the Martyr, Dublin. Their decision is usually known as the Tolboll decree, as the principal dispute was over the so-called Tolboll, the right of the Abbot of St. Thomas to levy a tax on every brewery in Dublin, which had evidently aroused a good deal of resentment, and was referred to by the Abbot's critics as a "pretended right". The arbitrators' remit did not extend to questioning the lawfulness of the Tolboll itself: their task was to set the tax at a level which it was hoped would be acceptable to all parties, and thus achieve a full and final settlement of the dispute. The arbitrators, in an unrelated ruling, found that the Dublin city fathers had the sole right to control the River Dodder, which was then, and remained for  several centuries afterwards, the main source of drinking water for the citizens of Dublin.

Despite his success as a businessman and as a local politician, his career was not entirely free from controversy. As Mayor of Dublin, he clashed with the highly respected Archbishop of Dublin, Hugh Inge. Archbishop Inge complained to the Privy Council of Ireland that the Dublin city fathers, led by Queytrot, had unlawfully seized the Manor of St. Sepulchre (this consisted of several adjoining manors which between them covered much of present-day Dublin city south of the River Liffey). The Archbishop claimed the manor as part of the liberty of the Archdiocese of Dublin. The Council referred the matter to a panel consisting of the Chief Justices of the three Courts of Common Law. The judges determined that the disputed property was indeed within the liberty of the Archbishop, and that he and his successors had the right to hold it in perpetuity, without let or hindrance from the Mayor of Dublin. It became colloquially known as the Archbishop's Liberty

Queytrot was also rather lax in his observation of the English Statute of 1406 (7 Henry IV c.17) which prohibited a master from hiring an apprentice whose father's annual income was less than 20 shillings. In 1525 and again in 1541 he was summoned before the Court of Exchequer (Ireland) for breach of the statute; but the fines imposed must have been small, since he continued to prosper in his business dealings.

More creditably he was a member, and for a time the Master, of Saint Anne's Guild, the leading religious guild in medieval Dublin, which was based at St. Audoen's Church.

His date of death is not recorded, but he probably died before 1552, when Walter Tyrrell was renting the house at Dame's Gate which Queytrot had leased in 1537 for a term of years. James Queytrot (fl. 1567), also a merchant of Dublin, was possibly his son. In 1567 he and Henry Browne leased lands at Dunboyne, County Meath, from the  English Crown for 21 years.

References

Sources
Calendar to the Fiants of the reign of Queen Elizabeth I
Gilbert, John T. editor Calendar of Ancient Records of Ireland 19 volumes Joseph Pollard Dublin 1889
Griffiths, Margaret C. editor Calendar  of Inquisitions formerly in the Office of the Chief Remembrancer  of the Exchequer Stationery Office Dublin 1991
O'Brien, Niall "Dublin masters and apprentices in the time of Henry VIII"  Medieval News  17 May 2014
Warburton, John; Whitelaw, James; Walsh, Robert History of the City of Dublin from the earliest accounts to the present day Cadell and Davies Dublin 1818

Lord Mayors of Dublin
16th-century Irish politicians
1470s births
1550s deaths
Year of birth uncertain
Year of death uncertain